This is an incomplete alphabetical list by surname of notable economists, experts in the social science of economics, past and present. For a history of economics, see the article History of economic thought. Only economists with biographical articles in Wikipedia are listed here.

A

B

C

D

E

F

G

H

I

J

K

L

M

N

O

P

Q

R

S

T

U
 Kazuhide Uekusa (植草一秀, born 1960), Japanese economist
 Hirofumi Uzawa (宇沢弘文, 1928–2014), Japanese economist

V

W

X

 Xenophon (c. 430–354 BCE), Ancient Greek, author of Oeconomicus

Y

Z

See also

 History of economic thought
 Schools of economic thought
 List of Austrian School economists
 List of business theorists
 List of feminist economists
 List of game theorists
 List of Jewish economists
 List of Marxian economists
 List of Nobel laureates in Economics
 List of socialist economists
 List of Slovenian economists
 List of think tanks
 List of Uruguayan economists

External links
 
 Overview: History of Economic Thought – Famous Economists
 Tom Coupé's list of the top 1000 contemporary economists, ranked by publication impact, at IDEAS/RePEc
 List of top 5% of contemporary economists, ranked by current research impact, at IDEAS/RePEc

Economists